Morton may refer to:

People 
 Morton (surname)
 Morton (given name)

Fictional 
 Morton Koopa, Jr., a character and boss in Super Mario Bros. 3
 A character in the Charlie and Lola franchise
 A character in the 2008 film Horton Hears a Who
 Morton Slumber, a funeral director who assists the diamond smuggling ring in Diamonds Are Forever
 Morton "Mort" Rainey, an author and the main character of the 2004 film Secret Window

Places

Canada
 Rural Municipality of Morton, Manitoba, a former rural municipality
 Morton, Ontario, a community in Rideau Lakes

England
 Morton, Carlisle, a place in Carlisle, Cumbria
 Morton, Eden, Cumbria
 Morton, Derbyshire
 Morton, Gloucestershire
 Morton, Isle of Wight
 Morton, a village in Morton and Hanthorpe parish, Lincolnshire
 Morton, West Lindsey, Lincolnshire
 Morton Hall, Lincolnshire
 Morton, Norfolk (or Morton on the Hill)
 Morton, Nottinghamshire
 Morton-on-Swale, North Yorkshire
 Morton, Shropshire, a location in Oswestry Rural parish, Shropshire
 Morton, West Yorkshire, a parish

Scotland
 Morton, Dumfries and Galloway, a civil parish
 Morton Castle, a seat of the Earls of Morton in Dumfries and Galloway, Scotland
 Morton, West Lothian

United States
 Morton, Illinois, a village
 Morton, Indiana, an unincorporated community
 Morton, Minnesota, a city
 Morton, Mississippi, a city
 Morton, Missouri, an unincorporated community
 Morton, New York
 Morton, Philadelphia, Pennsylvania, a neighborhood
 Morton, Pennsylvania, a borough
 Morton, Texas, a city
 Morton, Washington, a city
 Morton, Wyoming, an unincorporated community
 Morton Arboretum, a large plant collection in Lisle, Illinois
 Lake Morton, a lake in Florida
 Morton Township (disambiguation)
 Morton County (disambiguation)
 Camp Morton, an American Civil War military training ground and prisoner-of-war camp in Indianapolis, Indiana

Elsewhere
 Morton Strait, Antarctica
 Morton National Park, New South Wales, Australia
 Morton, Vienne, France, a commune

Businesses
 Morton Frozen Foods
 Morton's Potato Chips, an American company in the 1960s and 1970s
 Morton's Restaurant Group, owner and operator of upscale restaurants, including Morton's The Steakhouse
 Morton Salt
 Morton (restaurant), a Finnish restaurant chain

Schools
 Morton College, a community college in Cicero, Illinois
 Morton High School (disambiguation)

Titles
 Earl of Morton, a title in the Peerage of Scotland
 Morton baronets, a title in the Baronetage of England

Other uses
 Greenock Morton F.C., a Scottish football club
 Morton Stadium, Santry, Dublin, Ireland
 Morton station, a SEPTA Regional Rail station in Morton, Pennsylvania
 , a US Navy destroyer
 Ulmus 'Morton', a variety of elm tree that originated at the Morton Arboretum
 Morton's neuroma, a medical condition affecting the foot

See also
 Moreton (disambiguation)
 , a transport ship